The 1975 IIHF European U19 Championship was the eighth playing of the IIHF European Junior Championships.

Group A 
Played in Grenoble, France from March 21–30, 1975.

No team was relegated as it was decided to expand Group A from six to eight nations.

Tournament Awards
Top Scorer: Kent Nilsson  (10 Points)
Top Goalie: Sergei Babiriko
Top Defenceman:Bjorn Johansson
Top Forward: Karel Holý

Group B
Played in Herisau, Switzerland, from March 15–22, 1975.

First round 
Group 1

Group 2

Placing round 

Both Switzerland and Bulgaria were promoted to Group A for 1976.

References

Complete results

Junior
IIHF European Junior Championship tournament
International ice hockey competitions hosted by Switzerland
International ice hockey competitions hosted by France
U19
U19
IIHF European U19 Championships
Sports competitions in Grenoble
20th century in Grenoble
Herisau